Mr. Merlin  is an American sitcom that ran for one season, from 1981 to 1982, about Merlin the wizard (played by Barnard Hughes), who is immortal, living in modern-day San Francisco, and disguised as Max Merlin, a mechanic. Mr. Merlin was produced by Larry Rosen and Larry Tucker, working as the Larry Larry Company, in association with Columbia Pictures Television.

Premise 

Merlin hires Zachary Rogers (Clark Brandon) to work in his garage, and when Zac pulls a crowbar out of a bucket of cement, the crowbar is revealed to be Arthur's sword Excalibur and Merlin must reveal himself to Zac and make him an apprentice. Leo Samuels (Jonathan Prince) is Zac's best friend, who naturally has no idea his best buddy is a "wizard in training". Elaine Joyce is Alexandria ("Alex"), Max's equally magical liaison with an unseen "council" (who insisted Merlin take on an apprentice or lose both his powers and immortality).

Cast

Main 
 Barnard Hughes as Max Merlin, Merlin the Magician who now works as a mechanic in San Francisco.
 Clark Brandon as Zachary Rogers, Merlin's apprentice.
 Jonathan Prince as Leo Samuels, Zac's best friend.
 Elaine Joyce as Alexandria, Merlin's fellow magician.
 Phil Morris as the Kid.

Guest cast
 DeAnna Robbins in "Pilot" (Episode 1)
 Richard Basehart in "A Moment in Camelot" (Episode 7)
 Stacy Keach Sr. in "Take My Tonsils... Please!" (Episode 9)
 Scott McGinnis in "Not So Sweet Sixteen" (Episode 11)
 Mel Stewart in "Alex Goes Popless" (Episode 14)
 Catherine Mary Stewart and Rita Wilson in "Everything's Coming Up Daisies " (Episode 15)
 Eugene Roche in "Change of Venue: Part 1" (Episode 18)
 Holly Gagnier in "I Was a Teenage Loser" (Episode 22)

Episodes
Note: A Mr. Merlin strip ran briefly in the British TV Comic.

References

External links 
 

1981 American television series debuts
1982 American television series endings
1980s American sitcoms
Television series by Sony Pictures Television
CBS original programming
English-language television shows
Television series based on Arthurian legend
Television shows set in San Francisco
Works based on Merlin